, the following species are recognised in the genus Pristimantis.

A
 
Pristimantis aaptus 
Pristimantis abakapa 
Pristimantis academicus 
Pristimantis acatallelus 
Pristimantis acerus 
Pristimantis achatinus 
Pristimantis achupalla 
Pristimantis actinolaimus 
Pristimantis actites 
Pristimantis acuminatus 
Pristimantis acutirostris 
Pristimantis adiastolus 
Pristimantis adnus 
Pristimantis aemulatus 
Pristimantis affinis 
Pristimantis afrox 
Pristimantis alalocophus 
Pristimantis albericoi 
Pristimantis albertus 
Pristimantis albujai 
Pristimantis alius 
Pristimantis allpapuyu 
Pristimantis almendariz 
Pristimantis altae 
Pristimantis altamazonicus 
Pristimantis altamnis 
Pristimantis amaguanae 
Pristimantis ameliae 
Pristimantis amydrotus 
Pristimantis andinodiabolus 
Pristimantis andinogigas 
Pristimantis andinognomus 
Pristimantis anemerus 
Pristimantis angustilineatus 
Pristimantis aniptopalmatus 
Pristimantis anolirex 
Pristimantis anotis 
Pristimantis antisuyu 
Pristimantis apiculatus 
Pristimantis appendiculatus 
Pristimantis aquilonaris 
Pristimantis ardalonychus 
Pristimantis ardilae 
Pristimantis ardyae 
Pristimantis ashaninka 
Pristimantis astralos 
Pristimantis atillo 
Pristimantis atrabracus 
Pristimantis atratus 
Pristimantis attenboroughi 
Pristimantis aurantiguttatus 
Pristimantis aureolineatus 
Pristimantis aureoventris 
Pristimantis auricarens 
Pristimantis avicuporum 
Pristimantis avius

B

Pristimantis bacchus 
Pristimantis baiotis 
Pristimantis balionotus 
Pristimantis bambu 
Pristimantis barrigai 
Pristimantis baryecuus 
Pristimantis batrachites 
Pristimantis bearsei 
Pristimantis bellae 
Pristimantis bellator 
Pristimantis bellona 
Pristimantis bernali 
Pristimantis bicantus 
Pristimantis bicolor 
Pristimantis bicumulus 
Pristimantis bipunctatus 
Pristimantis blasi 
Pristimantis boconoensis 
Pristimantis bogotensis 
Pristimantis boucephalus 
Pristimantis boulengeri 
Pristimantis bounides 
Pristimantis bowara 
Pristimantis brevicrus 
Pristimantis brevifrons 
Pristimantis briceni 
Pristimantis bromeliaceus 
Pristimantis buccinator 
Pristimantis buckleyi 
Pristimantis buenaventura 
Pristimantis burtoniorum 
Pristimantis bustamante

C

Pristimantis cabrerai 
Pristimantis cacao 
Pristimantis caeruleonotus 
Pristimantis cajamarcensis 
Pristimantis cajanuma 
Pristimantis calcaratus 
Pristimantis calcarulatus 
Pristimantis calima 
Pristimantis campesino 
Pristimantis caniari 
Pristimantis cantitans 
Pristimantis capitonis 
Pristimantis caprifer 
Pristimantis carlosceroni 
Pristimantis carlossanchezi 
Pristimantis carranguerorum 
Pristimantis carvalhoi 
Pristimantis carylae 
Pristimantis caryophyllaceus 
Pristimantis cedros 
Pristimantis celator 
Pristimantis cerasinus 
Pristimantis ceuthospilus 
Pristimantis chalceus 
Pristimantis chamezensis 
Pristimantis charlottevillensis 
Pristimantis chiastonotus 
Pristimantis chimu 
Pristimantis chloronotus 
Pristimantis chocoensis 
Pristimantis chocolatebari 
Pristimantis chomskyi 
Pristimantis chrysops 
Pristimantis churuwiai 
Pristimantis cisnerosi 
Pristimantis citriogaster 
Pristimantis colodactylus 
Pristimantis colomai 
Pristimantis colonensis 
Pristimantis colostichos 
Pristimantis condor 
Pristimantis conservatio 
Pristimantis conspicillatus 
Pristimantis cordovae 
Pristimantis corniger 
Pristimantis coronatus 
Pristimantis corrugatus 
Pristimantis cosnipatae 
Pristimantis cremnobates 
Pristimantis crenunguis 
Pristimantis croceoinguinis 
Pristimantis crucifer 
Pristimantis cruciocularis 
Pristimantis cruentus 
Pristimantis cryophilius 
Pristimantis cryptomelas 
Pristimantis cryptopictus 
Pristimantis cuentasi 
Pristimantis culatensis 
Pristimantis cuneirostris 
Pristimantis curtipes

D

Pristimantis danae 
Pristimantis daquilemai 
Pristimantis degener 
Pristimantis deinops 
Pristimantis delius 
Pristimantis dendrobatoides 
Pristimantis devillei 
Pristimantis deyi 
Pristimantis diadematus 
Pristimantis diaphonus 
Pristimantis diogenes 
Pristimantis dissimulatus 
Pristimantis divnae 
Pristimantis dorado 
Pristimantis dorsopictus 
Pristimantis duellmani 
Pristimantis duende 
Pristimantis dundeei

E

Pristimantis ecuadorensis 
Pristimantis educatoris 
Pristimantis elegans 
Pristimantis enigmaticus 
Pristimantis epacrus 
Pristimantis eremitus 
Pristimantis eriphus 
Pristimantis ernesti 
Pristimantis erythroinguinis 
Pristimantis erythropleura 
Pristimantis erythros 
Pristimantis esmeraldas 
Pristimantis espedeus 
Pristimantis eugeniae 
Pristimantis euphronides 
Pristimantis eurydactylus 
Pristimantis exoristus

F

Pristimantis factiosus 
Pristimantis fallax 
Pristimantis farisorum 
Pristimantis fasciatus 
Pristimantis fenestratus 
Pristimantis ferwerdai 
Pristimantis festae 
Pristimantis fetosus 
Pristimantis flabellidiscus 
Pristimantis floridus 
Pristimantis frater

G

Pristimantis gagliardi 
Pristimantis gagliardoi 
Pristimantis gaigei 
Pristimantis galdi 
Pristimantis ganonotus 
Pristimantis geminus 
Pristimantis gentryi 
Pristimantis ginesi 
Pristimantis giorgii 
Pristimantis gladiator 
Pristimantis glandulosus 
Pristimantis gloria 
Pristimantis gracilis 
Pristimantis gralarias 
Pristimantis grandiceps 
Pristimantis gretathunbergae 
Pristimantis gryllus 
Pristimantis guaiquinimensis 
Pristimantis gualacenio 
Pristimantis gutturalis

H

Pristimantis hamiotae 
Pristimantis hampatusami 
Pristimantis hectus 
Pristimantis helvolus 
Pristimantis hernandezi 
Pristimantis hoogmoedi 
Pristimantis huicundo 
Pristimantis humboldti 
Pristimantis hybotragus

I

Pristimantis ignicolor 
Pristimantis iiap 
Pristimantis illotus 
Pristimantis imitatrix 
Pristimantis imthurni 
Pristimantis incanus 
Pristimantis incertus 
Pristimantis incomptus 
Pristimantis infraguttatus 
Pristimantis ingles 
Pristimantis inguinalis 
Pristimantis inusitatus 
Pristimantis ixalus

J

Pristimantis jabonensis 
Pristimantis jaguensis 
Pristimantis jaimei 
Pristimantis jamescameroni 
Pristimantis jester 
Pristimantis jimenezi 
Pristimantis johannesdei 
Pristimantis jorgevelosai 
Pristimantis juanchoi 
Pristimantis jubatus

K

Pristimantis kareliae 
Pristimantis katoptroides 
Pristimantis kelephus 
Pristimantis kichwarum 
Pristimantis kirklandi 
Pristimantis kiruhampatu 
Pristimantis koehleri 
Pristimantis kuri

L

Pristimantis labiosus 
Pristimantis lacrimosus 
Pristimantis lancinii 
Pristimantis lanthanites 
Pristimantis lasalleorum 
Pristimantis latericius 
Pristimantis laticlavius 
Pristimantis latidiscus 
Pristimantis latro 
Pristimantis ledzeppelin 
Pristimantis lemur 
Pristimantis leoni 
Pristimantis leopardus 
Pristimantis leptolophus 
Pristimantis leucopus 
Pristimantis leucorrhinus 
Pristimantis librarius 
Pristimantis lichenoides 
Pristimantis limoncochensis 
Pristimantis lindae 
Pristimantis lirellus 
Pristimantis lividus 
Pristimantis llanganati 
Pristimantis llojsintuta 
Pristimantis lojanus 
Pristimantis longicorpus 
Pristimantis loujosti 
Pristimantis loustes 
Pristimantis lucasi 
Pristimantis lucidosignatus 
Pristimantis luscombei 
Pristimantis luteolateralis 
Pristimantis lutitus 
Pristimantis lutzae 
Pristimantis lymani 
Pristimantis lynchi 
Pristimantis lythrodes

M

Pristimantis macrummendozai 
Pristimantis maculosus 
Pristimantis malkini 
Pristimantis mallii 
Pristimantis marahuaka 
Pristimantis marcoreyesi 
Pristimantis mariaelenae 
Pristimantis marmoratus 
Pristimantis mars 
Pristimantis martiae 
Pristimantis maryanneae 
Pristimantis matidiktyo 
Pristimantis matildae 
Pristimantis mazar 
Pristimantis medemi 
Pristimantis melanogaster 
Pristimantis melanoproctus 
Pristimantis memorans 
Pristimantis mendax 
Pristimantis meridionalis 
Pristimantis merostictus 
Pristimantis metabates 
Pristimantis miktos 
Pristimantis miltongallardoi 
Pristimantis mindo 
Pristimantis minimus 
Pristimantis minutulus 
Pristimantis miyatai 
Pristimantis mnionaetes 
Pristimantis moa 
Pristimantis modipeplus 
Pristimantis molybrignus 
Pristimantis mondolfii 
Pristimantis morlaco 
Pristimantis moro 
Pristimantis muchimuk 
Pristimantis multicolor 
Pristimantis munozi 
Pristimantis muranunka 
Pristimantis muricatus 
Pristimantis muscosus 
Pristimantis museosus 
Pristimantis mutabilis 
Pristimantis myersi 
Pristimantis myops

N

Pristimantis nangaritza 
Pristimantis nankints 
Pristimantis nanus 
Pristimantis nebulosus 
Pristimantis nelsongalloi 
Pristimantis nephophilus 
Pristimantis nervicus 
Pristimantis nicefori 
Pristimantis nietoi 
Pristimantis nigrogriseus 
Pristimantis nimbus 
Pristimantis nubisilva 
Pristimantis nyctophylax

O

Pristimantis obmutescens 
Pristimantis ocellatus 
Pristimantis ockendeni 
Pristimantis ocreatus 
Pristimantis okmoi 
Pristimantis olivaceus 
Pristimantis omarrhynchus 
Pristimantis omeviridis 
Pristimantis onorei 
Pristimantis orcesi 
Pristimantis orcus 
Pristimantis orestes 
Pristimantis ornatissimus 
Pristimantis ornatus 
Pristimantis orpacobates 
Pristimantis orphnolaimus 
Pristimantis ortizi

P

Pristimantis padiali 
Pristimantis pahuma 
Pristimantis paisa 
Pristimantis palmeri 
Pristimantis paquishae 
Pristimantis paramerus 
Pristimantis pardalinus 
Pristimantis pardalis 
Pristimantis parectatus 
Pristimantis pariagnomus 
Pristimantis parvillus 
Pristimantis pastazensis 
Pristimantis pataikos 
Pristimantis paulodutrai 
Pristimantis paulpittmani 
Pristimantis paululus 
Pristimantis pecki 
Pristimantis pedimontanus 
Pristimantis penelopus 
Pristimantis peraticus 
Pristimantis percnopterus 
Pristimantis percultus 
Pristimantis permixtus 
Pristimantis peruvianus 
Pristimantis petersi 
Pristimantis petersioides 
Pristimantis petrobardus 
Pristimantis phalaroinguinis 
Pristimantis phalarus 
Pristimantis pharangobates 
Pristimantis philipi 
Pristimantis phoxocephalus 
Pristimantis phragmipleuron 
Pristimantis piceus 
Pristimantis pichincha 
Pristimantis pictus 
Pristimantis pinchaque 
Pristimantis pinguis 
Pristimantis pirrensis 
Pristimantis platychilus 
Pristimantis platydactylus 
Pristimantis pleurostriatus 
Pristimantis pluvialis 
Pristimantis pluvian 
Pristimantis polemistes 
Pristimantis polychrus 
Pristimantis postducheminorum 
Pristimantis pramukae 
Pristimantis prolatus 
Pristimantis proserpens 
Pristimantis pruinatus 
Pristimantis pseudoacuminatus 
Pristimantis pteridophilus 
Pristimantis ptochus 
Pristimantis pugnax 
Pristimantis puipui 
Pristimantis pulchridormientes 
Pristimantis pulvinatus 
Pristimantis punzan 
Pristimantis puruscafeum 
Pristimantis pycnodermis 
Pristimantis pyrrhomerus

Q

Pristimantis quantus 
Pristimantis quaquaversus 
Pristimantis quicato 
Pristimantis quinquagesimus 
Pristimantis quintanai

R

Pristimantis racemus 
Pristimantis ramagii 
Pristimantis reclusus 
Pristimantis reichlei 
Pristimantis relictus 
Pristimantis renjiforum 
Pristimantis repens 
Pristimantis restrepoi 
Pristimantis reticulatus 
Pristimantis rhabdocnemus 
Pristimantis rhabdolaemus 
Pristimantis rhigophilus 
Pristimantis rhodoplichus 
Pristimantis rhodostichus 
Pristimantis ridens 
Pristimantis rivasi 
Pristimantis riveroi 
Pristimantis riveti 
Pristimantis romanorum 
Pristimantis romeroae 
Pristimantis roni 
Pristimantis rosadoi 
Pristimantis roseus 
Pristimantis royi 
Pristimantis rozei 
Pristimantis rubicundus 
Pristimantis ruedai 
Pristimantis rufioculis 
Pristimantis rufoviridis 
Pristimantis ruidus 
Pristimantis rupicola

S

Pristimantis sacharuna 
Pristimantis sagittulus 
Pristimantis salaputium 
Pristimantis saltissimus 
Pristimantis samaipatae 
Pristimantis samaniegoi 
Pristimantis sambalan 
Pristimantis sanguineus 
Pristimantis sarisarinama 
Pristimantis satagius 
Pristimantis saturninoi 
Pristimantis savagei 
Pristimantis schultei 
Pristimantis scitulus 
Pristimantis scoloblepharus 
Pristimantis scolodiscus 
Pristimantis scopaeus 
Pristimantis seorsus 
Pristimantis serendipitus 
Pristimantis shrevei 
Pristimantis signifer 
Pristimantis silverstonei 
Pristimantis simonbolivari 
Pristimantis simonsii 
Pristimantis simoteriscus 
Pristimantis simoterus 
Pristimantis sinschi 
Pristimantis siopelus 
Pristimantis sira 
Pristimantis sirnigeli 
Pristimantis skydmainos 
Pristimantis sneiderni 
Pristimantis sobetes 
Pristimantis spectabilis 
Pristimantis spilogaster 
Pristimantis spinosus 
Pristimantis stenodiscus 
Pristimantis sternothylax 
Pristimantis stictoboubonus 
Pristimantis stictogaster 
Pristimantis stictus 
Pristimantis stipa 
Pristimantis subsigillatus 
Pristimantis suetus 
Pristimantis sulculus 
Pristimantis supernatis 
Pristimantis surdus 
Pristimantis susaguae 
Pristimantis symptosus

T

Pristimantis taciturnus 
Pristimantis taeniatus 
Pristimantis tamsitti 
Pristimantis tantanti 
Pristimantis tanyrhynchus 
Pristimantis telefericus 
Pristimantis tenebrionis 
Pristimantis terrapacis 
Pristimantis teslai 
Pristimantis thectopternus 
Pristimantis thyellus 
Pristimantis thymalopsoides 
Pristimantis thymelensis 
Pristimantis tiktik 
Pristimantis tinajillas 
Pristimantis tinguichaca 
Pristimantis toftae 
Pristimantis torrenticola 
Pristimantis torresi 
Pristimantis totoroi 
Pristimantis trachyblepharis 
Pristimantis tribulosus 
Pristimantis truebae 
Pristimantis tubernasus 
Pristimantis tungurahua 
Pristimantis turik 
Pristimantis turpinorum 
Pristimantis turumiquirensis

U

Pristimantis uisae 
Pristimantis ujucami 
Pristimantis unistrigatus 
Pristimantis urani 
Pristimantis uranobates 
Pristimantis urichi

V

Pristimantis vanadise 
Pristimantis variabilis 
Pristimantis veletis 
Pristimantis ventrigranulosus 
Pristimantis ventriguttatus 
Pristimantis ventrimarmoratus 
Pristimantis ventristellatus 
Pristimantis verecundus 
Pristimantis verrucolatus 
Pristimantis versicolor 
Pristimantis vertebralis 
Pristimantis vicarius 
Pristimantis vidua 
Pristimantis viejas 
Pristimantis vilarsi 
Pristimantis vilcabambae 
Pristimantis vinhai 
Pristimantis viridicans 
Pristimantis viridis

W

Pristimantis w-nigrum 
Pristimantis wagteri 
Pristimantis walkeri 
Pristimantis waoranii 
Pristimantis wiensi

X

Pristimantis xeniolum 
Pristimantis xestus 
Pristimantis xylochobates

Y

Pristimantis yanezi 
Pristimantis yantzaza 
Pristimantis yaviensis 
Pristimantis yukpa 
Pristimantis yumbo 
Pristimantis yuruaniensis 
Pristimantis yustizi

Z

Pristimantis zeuctotylus 
Pristimantis zimmermanae 
Pristimantis zoilae 
Pristimantis zophus 
Pristimantis zorro

References

Pristimantis
Pristimantis